Horace Gwynne Allen (July 27, 1855–February 12, 1919) was an American lawyer and politician.

Early life
Allen was born on July 27, 1855 in Jamaica Plain to Stephen M. and Ann M. Allen. Allen attended Boston public schools and graduated from Harvard Law School in 1876. He was admitted to the Suffolk County, Massachusetts bar on February 5, 1877.

Personal life
In 1881, Allen married Grace Dupee Chamberlain, the only daughter of Fanny and Joshua Chamberlain to survive into adulthood. Allen's father was a lifelong friend of Fanny Chamberlain. Horace and Grace Allen had three daughters, Eleanor, Beatrice, and Rosamund. Grace was crippled following a car accident in 1910.

Political career
In 1888, Allen was elected to the Boston Common Council. In 1889 he was elected council president by a 37 to 36 vote. He was reelected president in 1890. The Democrats had a majority on the council in 1891 and elected a member of their party as president. In 1891, Allen defeated Homer Rogers 144 to 95 at the Republican city convention to win the Republican nomination for Mayor of Boston. He lost the 1891 Boston mayoral election to Democratic incumbent Nathan Matthews Jr. 63% to 36%. Allen considered running in 1892, but withdrew from consideration shortly before the party convention. In 1895 and 1896, Allen served on the Boston Board of Aldermen. In 1896, Allen was appointed to the Boston transit commission by acting governor Roger Wolcott. He remained on the commission until 1918. Allen died on February 12, 1919.

Reference

1855 births
1919 deaths
Boston Board of Aldermen members
Harvard Law School alumni
Massachusetts lawyers
Massachusetts Republicans
Politicians from Boston